Bridal Suite is a 1939 American comedy film directed by Wilhelm Thiele and written by Samuel Hoffenstein. The film stars Annabella, Robert Young, Walter Connolly, Reginald Owen, Gene Lockhart, and Arthur Treacher. The film was released on May 26, 1939, by Metro-Goldwyn-Mayer. The film was the debut of Robert Blake, who played an uncredited role as a child.

Plot
Neil McGill, a wealthy and spoiled American playboy, who is engaged to his fiancée, Abbie, becomes attracted to Luise Anzengruber, a poor innkeeper, at a Swiss chalet, which he visiting with his mother. When Luise finds Neil's advances as inappropriate, she rebuffs him and goes on a hike in the mountains with Dr. Grauer. Luise and the doctor are stranded and Neil searches for them. Neil finds the pair, but is also stranded after an avalanche. Luise warms up to Neil and the three are rescued. Upon their return to the chalet, Neil tells Dr. Grauer he wants to marry Luise, but has not told his mother his intentions. Dr. Grauer warns him that his marriage to Luise would require him to put away his playboy lifestyle in exchange for hard work. When Neil says he has nothing to offer Luise but his charm, Dr. Grauer convinces him to forget marrying Luise and return to America. Neil's mother makes plans for Neil and Abbie to marry on the ship, but Luise unexpectedly shows up. Luise discovers Neil and Abbie's plans and leaves. Neil confesses his love for Luise to Abbie. Abbie replies she intends to marry him and take him for everything he's got. Neil pursues Luise who runs away from him.  Neil's attempt to stop her results in a fight breaking out with bystanders. When the ship arrives, Neil's parents are exasperated that Neil, once again, has run away from marriage.  Storming in to Neil's room, they discover Neil in bed with Luise, who is now his wife. Neil's father, with Luise's insistence, offers him a job in his business as a shipping clerk, which Neil happily accepts.

Cast
 Annabella as Luise Anzengruber
 Robert Young as Neil McGill
 Walter Connolly as Doctor Grauer
 Reginald Owen as Sir Horace Bragdon
 Gene Lockhart as Cornelius McGill
 Arthur Treacher as Lord Helfer
 Billie Burke as Mrs. McGill
 Virginia Field as Abbie Bragdon
 Felix Bressart as Maxl

Television view
This film received its initial USA telecast in Los Angeles Tuesday 18 December 1956 on KTTV (Channel 11); it first aired in New Haven CT 14 January 1957 on WNHC (Channel 8), in Cincinnati 15 January 1957 on WXIX (Channel 19) (Newport KY), in Philadelphia 12 February 1957 on WFIL (Channel 6), in Altoona PA 24 February 1957 on WFBG (Channel 10), in Seattle 28 February 1957 on KING (Channel 5), in Chicago 1 March 1957 on WBBM (Channel 2), in Minneapolis 20 April 1957 on KMGM (Channel 9) and in Norfolk VA 6 May 1957 on WTAR (Channel 3); in San Francisco it was first seen Monday 21 December 1959 on KGO-TV (Channel 7); its earliest documented telecast in New York City presently stands at Saturday 18 May 1963 on WCBS (Channel 2).

References

External links

 
 
 
 

1939 films
1930s English-language films
American comedy films
1939 comedy films
Metro-Goldwyn-Mayer films
Films directed by Wilhelm Thiele
Films set in Switzerland
American black-and-white films
1930s American films